Kolhi is a subgroup of Koli community native to Sindh, Pakistan. Kolhi's mostly are Hindu but some of them are Christian and Muslim. They engage in agriculture and most of them are poor peasants and sharecroppers.

Kolhi community is said to hail from Gujarat. They migrated from there first to Kutch thence they came to Thar and Parkar. Kolhis have similar subcastes such as Thakor, Khant, Baria and Chunvalia.

Notable Kolhi 

 Krishna Kumari Kolhi, member of Senate of Pakistan
 Rooplo Kolhi, Indian (now Pakistani) freedom fighter
Veerji Kolhi, Advocate of High Court Sindh, senior member of the Human Rights Commission of Pakistan, and Human rights activist and special assistant of the Chief Minister of Sindh for Human Rights Department, Government of Sindh

See also 
 Koli rebellions
 List of Koli people
 List of Koli states and clans

References 

Sindhi tribes 
Sindhi people 
Sindhi tribes in India 
Social groups of Pakistan
Society of Pakistan 
Christianity in Pakistan 
Islam in Pakistan